Gisele or Gisèle may refer to:

Persons
 Gisele (given name)
 Gisele, mononym of Brazilian model Gisele Bündchen

See also
 Giselle (disambiguation)